Daniel Hays may refer to:
 Dan Hays  (born 1939), Canadian politician
 Daniel Hays (New York politician) (1833–1913), American glove manufacturer and politician
 Daniel P. Hays (1854–1923), Jewish-American lawyer from New York